Satlasana is a town in Satlasna taluka in Mehsana district of Gujarat state, India. It is a Taluka headquarter.

Kheralu, Khedbrahma, Idar, Vadnagar are the nearby cities.

The town was a headquarter of Thana during Agency period.

References 

Villages in Mehsana district